Mael Ruanaidh Ua Dubhda, died 1005.

Annanlistic references

 1005. Maelruanaidh, son of Aedh Ua Dubhda, lord of Ui-Fiachrach-Muirisge, and his son, i.e. Maelseachlainn, and his brother, i.e. Gebhennach, son of Aedh, died.

External links
 http://www.ucc.ie/celt/published/T100005B/

References

 The History of Mayo, Hubert T. Knox, p. 379, 1908.
 Araile do fhlathaibh Ua nDubhda/Some of the princes of Ui Dhubhda, pp. 676–681, Leabhar na nGenealach:The Great Book of Irish Genealogies, Dubhaltach Mac Fhirbhisigh (died 1671), eag. Nollaig Ó Muraíle, 2004–05, De Burca, Dublin.

Monarchs from County Mayo
10th-century Irish monarchs
11th-century Irish monarchs
1005 deaths
Year of birth unknown